is an interchange passenger railway station in the city of Chōshi, Chiba, Japan, operated by the East Japan Railway Company (JR East) and also used by the private railway operator Choshi Electric Railway.

Lines

Station layout
The JR East station facilities consist of one side platform and one island platform serving three tracks. A bay platform is located between the JR platforms 2 and 3 for Choshi Electric Railway trains. The station has a "Midori no Madoguchi" staffed ticket office.

Platforms

History

Chōshi Station opened on 1 June 1897 as a station on the Sōbu Railway. On 1 September 1907, the Sōbu Railway was nationalized, becoming part of the Japanese Government Railway (JGR).

The original station building was replaced by a new two-storey wood-frame-and-mortar building in 1936. An additional platform was added at the same time, and a new underground passage was opened linking the new platform. The 1936 station building lasted only nine years, as it was destroyed in 1945 by fire during World War II. The third-generation station building was completed in January 1948, and a further platform was added at the same time, creating the three-platform arrangement that continues to this day.

After World War II, JGR became the Japanese National Railways (JNR). Scheduled freight operations were suspended from 31 March 1978. The station was absorbed into the JR East network upon the privatization of JNR on 1 April 1987.

A roof was added to the entrance to the Choshi Electric Railway platform in December 1974, and this was replaced by the present-day Dutch-style building in November 1990.

Passenger statistics
In fiscal 2019, the JR portion of the station was used by an average of 3045 passengers daily (boarding passengers only). In fiscal 2018, the Choshi Electric Railway station was used by an average of 384 passengers daily (boarding passengers only). The passenger figures for previous years are as shown below.

Surrounding area
 Chōshi City Office
 Chiba Institute of Science
 Yamasa head office and soy sauce factory
 Higeta soy sauce factory
 Choshi Camera Museum
 Futaba Elementary School
 Tone River

Bus terminal 
The following long-distance buses operate from Choshi Station.

See also
 List of railway stations in Japan

References

External links

  

Sōbu Main Line
Chōshi Electric Railway Line
Stations of East Japan Railway Company
Stations of Chōshi Electric Railway Line
Railway stations in Chiba Prefecture
Railway stations in Japan opened in 1897
Buildings and structures in Japan destroyed during World War II
Chōshi